The Battle of the Coral Sea, a major engagement of the Pacific Theatre of World War II, was fought 4–8 May 1942 in the waters east of New Guinea and south of the Bismarck Islands between elements of the Imperial Japanese Navy and Allied naval and air forces from the United States (U.S.) and Australia.

To extend their empire in the Pacific to the conquest of Australia, the Japanese first had to capture the naval and air center of Port Moresby on the southeast coast of New Guinea. In order to extend the reach of their air searches for Allied naval forces, they resolved to simultaneously establish a seaplane base at Tulagi in the lower Solomon Islands. The U.S. learned of the Japanese plan, known as Operation Mo, through signals intelligence and sent two United States Navy carrier task forces and a joint Australian-American cruiser force to oppose the Japanese offensive.

The result was a strategic defeat for the Japanese, since their principal goal of landing troops at Port Moresby was thwarted, but a tactical defeat for the Allies, who suffered more significant ship losses.

Because the Japanese assumed the tactical initiative, their forces are listed first.

Forces deployed 

Losses in parentheses

Japanese Forces 

 Task Force MO 
Vice Admiral Shigeyoshi Inoue, Commander, Fourth Fleet in light cruiser Kashima anchored at Rabaul

Carrier Striking Force 

Vice Admiral Takeo Takagi in heavy cruise Myōkō
 Carrier Division 5 (Rear Adm. Chūichi Hara, Officer in Tactical Command in Zuikaku)
 2 fleet carriers
  (Capt. Takaji Jōjima)
 Air Group (Lt. Cmdr. Kakuichi Takahashi)
 21 Mitsubishi A6M "Zeke" fighters (Lt. Takumi Hoashi)
 20 Aichi D3A Type 99 "Val" dive bombers (Lt. Masao Yamaguchi)
 19 Nakajima B5N Type 97 "Kate" torpedo bombers (Lt. Tatsuo Ichihara)
  (Capt. Ichihei Yokogawa)
 Air Group (Lt. Cmdr. Shigekazu Shimazaki)
 25 Mitsubishi A6M "Zeke" fighters (Lt. Kiyokuma Okajima)
 22 Aichi D3A "Val" dive bombers (Lt. Tamotsu Ema)
 20 Nakajima B5N "Kate" torpedo bombers (Lt. Yoshiaki Tsubota)
 Cruiser Division 5 (Vice Adm. Takagi in Myōkō)
 2 heavy cruisers 
 Both : , 
 Destroyer Division 5
 2 destroyers 
 Both : , 
 Destroyer Division 7
 4 destroyers
 1 oiler:

Invasion Forces 

Rear Admiral Aritomo Gotō in heavy cruiser Aoba

 Tulagi Invasion Group
 Rear Admiral Kiyohide Shima in minelayer Okinoshima 
 1 transport: Azumasan Maru
 Embarking 400 troops from the 3rd Kure Special Naval Landing Force (SNLF) plus a construction detachment from the 7th Establishment Squad.
 2 minelayers: , Kōei Maru
 2 destroyers: , 
 5 minesweepers: Wa #1, Wa #2, Hagoromo Maru, Noshiro Maru #2, Tama Maru
 2 subchasers: Toshi Maru #3, Tama Maru #8

 Support Group/Close Cover Force
 Rear Admiral Kuninori Marumo in light cruiser Tenryū
 Cruiser Division 18 (Rear Adm. Marumo)
 2 light cruisers
 Both Tenryū-class: , 
 2 seaplane tenders
 
 Air group: 12 aircraft
 
 Air group (attached)
 3 gunboats: Keijo Maru, Seikai Maru, Nikkai Maru

 Covering Group/Main Body Support Force
 Rear Admiral Gotō in heavy cruiser Aoba
 1 light carrier 
 Air Group (Lt. Kenjirō Nōtomi)
 8 Mitsubishi A6M Zero and 4 Mitsubishi A5M "Claude" fighters (Lt. Nōtomi)
 6 Nakajima B5N Type 97 "Kate" torpedo bombers (Lt. Michitarō Nakamoto)
 1 destroyer: 

 Port Moresby Invasion Group
 Rear Admiral Sadamichi Kajioka in light cruiser Yūbari
 Transport Unit (Rear Adm. Kōsō Abe)
 5 Imperial Japanese Navy (IJN) transports: Mogamigawa Maru, Chōwa Maru, Goyō Maru, Akiba Maru, Shōka Maru.
 Embarking approximately 500 troops from the 3rd Kure SNLF plus construction specialists from the 10th Establishment Squad
 6 Imperial Japanese Army (IJA) transports: Asakasan Maru, China Maru, Mito Maru, Matsue Maru, Taifuku Maru, Hibi Maru
 Embarking South Seas Detachment of approximately 5,000 troops
 5 minesweepers: W-20 (Wa #20), Hagoromo Maru, Noshiro Maru #2, Fumi Maru #2, Seki Maru #3.
 1 minelayer:  (Capt. Inagaki Yoshiaki)
 1 salvage tugboat: Woshima 2 oilers: Hoyo Maru,  
 Screen 1 light cruiser:  (Capt. Masami Ban)

 Submarine Force 
Captain Noboru Ishizaki Patrol/Scouting Group: I-21, I-22, I-24, I-28, I-29 Raiding Group: Ro-33, Ro-34 Air Forces 

 25th Air Flotilla Rear Admiral Sadayoshi Yamada 4th Air Group (based at Rabaul)
 17 Mitsubishi G4M Type 1 "Betty" land attack bombers
 Tainan Air Group (based at Lae and Rabaul)
 18 Mitsubishi A6M Zero "Zeke"
   6 Mitsubishi A5M "Claude" fighters (Capt. Masahisa Saitō)
 Yokohama Air Group (based at Rabaul, Shortland Islands, and Tulagi)
 12 Kawanishi H6K "Mavis" reconnaissance seaplanes
   9 Nakajima A6M2-N "Rufe" seaplane fighters
 Genzan Air Group (based at Rabaul)
 25 Mitsubishi G3M Type 96 "Nell" land attack bombers

 Allied Forces 

 Task Force 17 

Rear Admiral Frank Jack Fletcher in Yorktown

 Carrier Air Group (TG 17.5)
 Rear Admiral Aubrey W. Fitch, Officer in Tactical Command (OTC)
 2 fleet carriers  (Capt. Elliott Buckmaster)
 Air Group (Lt. Cmdr. Oscar Pederson)
 VF-42: 17 F4F Wildcat fighters (Lt. Cmdr. Charles R. Fenton)
 VB-5: 18 SBD Dauntless dive bombers (Lt. Wallace C. Short)
 VS-5: 17 SBD Dauntless scout bombers (Lt. Cmdr. William O. Burch, Jr.)
 VT-5: 13 TBD Devastator torpedo bombers (Lt. Cmdr. Joe Taylor)
  (Capt. Frederick C. Sherman) 
 Air Group (Cmdr. William B. Ault)
 VF-2: 21 F4F Wildcat fighters (Lt. Cmdr. Paul H. Ramsey)
 VB-2: 18 SBD Dauntless dive bombers (Lt. Cmdr. Weldon L. Hamilton)
 VS-2: 17 SBD Dauntless scout bombers (Lt. Cmdr. Robert E. Dixon)
 VT-2: 12 TBD Devastator torpedo bombers (Lt. Cmdr. James H. Brett, Jr.)
 4 destroyers All Sims-class (4 × 5-in. main battery) 
  (Cmdr. Harry B. Jarrett)
  (Lt. Cmdr. John K. B. Ginder)
  (Lt. Cmdr. Arnold E. True)
  (Lt. Cmdr. Glenn R. Hartwig)

 Attack Group (TG 17.2)
 Rear Admiral Thomas C. Kinkaid  5 heavy cruisers 3 Astoria-class (9 × 8-in. main battery)
  (Capt. Howard H. Good)
  (Capt. Francis W. Scanland)
  (Capt. Frank J. Lowry)
 1 Portland-class (9 × 8-in. main battery)
  (Capt. Benjamin Perlman)
 1 Northampton-class (9 × 8-in. main battery)
  (Capt. Thomas M. Shock)
 Screen (Capt. Alexander R. Early)
 5 destroyers
 1 Porter-class (8 × 5-in. main battery)
  (Lt. Cmdr. Edward L. Beck)
 4 Farragut-class (5 × 5-in. main battery)
  (Cmdr. George P. Hunter)
  (Lt. Cmdr. Charles F. Chillingworth, Jr.)
  (Lt. Cmdr. William P. Burfor
  (Lt. Cmdr. Robert H. Rogers)

 Support Group (TG 17.3)
 Rear Admiral John Gregory Crace, RAN
 2 heavy cruisers
 1  (9 × 8-in. main battery): Chicago (Capt. Howard D. Bode)
 1  (8 × 8-in. main battery):  Australia (Capt. H. B. Farncomb, RAN)
 1 light cruiser
 1  (8 × 6-in. main battery):  Hobart (Capt. H. L. Howden, RAN)
 2 destroyers
 1 Mahan-class (5 × 5-in.main battery): Perkins (Lt. Cmdr. Walter C. Ford)
 1 Sims-class (4 × 5-in. main battery): Walke (Lt. Cmdr. Thomas E. Fraser)

 Fueling Group (TG 17.6)
 Captain John S. Phillips
 2 oilers
 Neosho , Tippecanoe 2 destroyers
   (Lt. Cmdr. Willford M. Hyman†), Worden Search Group (TG 17.9)
 Commander George H. DeBaun
 1 seaplane tender
 Tangier Patrol Squadron 71 (VP-71): 6 PBY-5 Catalinas
 Patrol Squadron 72 (VP-72): 6 PBY-5 Catalinas

 South West Pacific Area 

General Douglas MacArthur Allied Naval Forces
 Vice Admiral Herbert F. Leary Task Group 42.1 (Capt. Ralph Waldo Christie in submarine tender USS Griffin at Brisbane)
 Subdiv 53 (Lt. Cmdr. Elmer E. Yeomans):  S-42, S-43, S-44, S-45, S-46, S-47
 Subdiv 201 (Cmdr. Ralston B. Van Zant):  S-37, S-38, S-39, S-40, S-41
 Task Force 44 – temporarily assigned to Task Force 17, see Task Group 17.3 above

 Allied Air Forces 
 Lieutenant General George Brett  United States Army Air Forces 8th Pursuit Group: 26 P-39 Airacobra fighters at Archerfield, Brisbane
 35th Fighter Squadron at Port Moresby
 36th Fighter Squadron at  Port Moresby
 49th Pursuit Group: 90 P-40 Tomahawk fighters at Darwin
 7th Fighter Squadron at Darwin
 8th Fighter Squadron at Darwin
 9th Fighter Squadron at Darwin
 3rd Light Bombardment Group
 8th Light Bombardment Squadron: A-24 Banshee dive bombers at Port Moresby
 13th Light Bombardment Squadron: B-25 Mitchell bombers
 90th Light Bombardment Squadron: B-25 Mitchell bombers
 19th Bombardment Group: 17 Boeing B-17 bombers at Townsville (Lt. Col. Connally (first name unknown))
 30th Bombardment Squadron
 40th Reconnaissance Squadron
 93rd Bombardment Squadron
 435th Bombardment Squadron
 22nd Bombardment Group: 48 Martin B-26 Marauders
  Royal Australian Air Force No. 11 Squadron: Consolidated PBY Catalinas
 No. 20 Squadron: PBY Catalinas
 No. 24 Squadron: 3 CAC Wirraways at Townsville
 No. 32 Squadron: Lockheed Hudsons at Port Moresby
 No. 75 Squadron: 3 Curtiss P-40s at Port MoresbyPort Moresby garrison'''
 Major General B. M. Morris
 Approximately 5,000 troops
 30th Infantry Brigade
 39th Infantry Battalion
 49th Infantry Battalion
 53rd Infantry Battalion
 13th Field Regiment
 23rd Heavy Anti-Aircraft Battery
 Detachment, 1st Independent Company
 30th Infantry Brigade Signal Section
 30th Infantry Brigade HQ Defence Platoon
 Moresby Fixed Defences
 Moresby Fixed Defences Fortress Engineers
 Moresby Fixed Defences Anti-Aircraft Artillery (six 3-inch guns)
 1st Army Troops Company
 7th Field Company
 1st Section, 1st Mechanical Equipment Company
 8th Military District Survey Section
 8th Military District Bomb Disposal Section
 8th Military District Signals
 8th Military District Defence and Employment Company
 New Guinea Volunteer Rifles
 Papuan Infantry Battalion, 
 8th Military District Section Intelligence Corps
 15th Supply Personnel Company
 8th Military District Bulk Issue Petrol and Oil Depot
 A Section, 8th Military District Mechanical Transport Company
 Base Hospital
 3rd Field Ambulance
 113th Convalescent Depot
 8th Military District Dental Centre
 45th Dental Unit
 253rd Dental Unit
 256th Dental Unit
 274th Dental Unit
 301st Dental Unit
 421st Dental Unit
 15th Optical Unit
 8th Military District Depot of Medical Stores
 16th Field Hygiene Section
 8th Military District Ordnance Depot
 19th Ordnance Ammunition Section
 109th Infantry Brigade Group Field Workshop
 109th Infantry Brigade Group Ordnance Field Park
 30th Infantry Brigade Provost Platoon
 8th Military District Accounts Office
 8th Military District Postal Unit
 8th Military District Records Office
 8th Military District Stationery Depot
 8th Military District Printing Section
 8th Military District Graves Registration and Inquiries Unit
 8th Military District Laundry and Decontamination Unit
 8th Military District Army Field Bakery
 8th Military District Base Depot
 8th Military District Marine Section
 8th Military District Canteen Services
 8th Military District Training Centre
 Australian New Guinea Administrative Unit

Notes

References

Bibliography

Printed sources

Web

 
 
 
 
 
 

World War II orders of battle
Pacific Ocean theatre of World War II